The Grace Helbig Show is an American late-night talk show created and hosted by YouTube star Grace Helbig which aired on E! cable network. It premiered on April 3, 2015, and the first season ended on June 7, 2015.

History
On August 6, 2014, Deadline Hollywood reported that Grace Helbig was to star in a comedy/talk show pilot, tentatively called The Grace Helbig Project. The announcement came only a few weeks before the conclusion of another E! late-night talk show, Chelsea Lately, which Helbig had previously appeared on.

On March 10, 2015, E! stated in a press release that the show, now titled The Grace Helbig Show, would premiere on April 3, 2015, at 10:30 pm ET, following The Soup.

On May 11, 2015, the network announced that the show would be moving from Fridays at 10:30 pm ET to Sundays at 11 pm ET, beginning May 31, 2015.

Episodes

International broadcast
The Grace Helbig Show airs in simulcast in Canada on E!, the Canadian equivalent of the US channel. The show premiered on E! in Australia and New Zealand on Sunday, April 5, 2015, and on April 20, 2015, in the United Kingdom.

References

External links 

 
 
 

2015 American television series debuts
2015 American television series endings
2010s American late-night television series
E! original programming
English-language television shows